Nana Mizuki Live Fighter -Blue x Red Side- is the 7th live DVD and 1st Blu-ray Disc release from J-pop star and voice actress Nana Mizuki.

Track listing
Both Blue Side and Red Side were performed in the summer of 2008, on July 5 and July 6 respectively.

Nana Mizuki video albums
Live video albums
2008 video albums